Edward D. 'Ed' Clere (born April 16, 1974) is a Republican member of the Indiana House of Representatives, representing the 72nd District. He is seen as a bipartisan legislator who encourages constituent outreach.

In 2015, Clere, concerned about the rapid spread of HIV in Scott County, Indiana, urged then-governor Mike Pence to sign an executive order to allow needle exchange programs to operate. After resisting the intervention for over two months, Pence spoke to the county sheriff, prayed for guidance, then capitulated, allowing such a program to address the epidemic. The rate of infection slowed dramatically.

Clere received the Chancellor's Medal from Indiana University Southeast in 2016.

References

External links
 Ed Clere at Ballotpedia
State Representative Edward Clere official Indiana State Legislature site
 

Republican Party members of the Indiana House of Representatives
Living people
1974 births
People from Indiana
21st-century American politicians
American United Methodists
Indiana University Southeast alumni